Tolv Aamland (21 January 1893 – 10 December 1983) was a Norwegian politician for the Liberal Party.

He served as a deputy representative to the Parliament of Norway from Aust-Agder during the term 1945–1949. In total he met during ten days of parliamentary session.

Hailing from Birkenes, he was a school principal in his professional life. During the occupation of Norway by Nazi Germany he was imprisoned in Arkivet in May 1942.

References

1893 births
1983 deaths
People from Birkenes
Aust-Agder politicians
Liberal Party (Norway) politicians
Deputy members of the Storting
Heads of schools in Norway
Nazi concentration camp survivors